WEGO Visitor Transportation System (WEGO) is a bus system in Niagara Falls, Ontario jointly operated by Niagara Falls Transit and the Niagara Parks Commission. It replaced Niagara Falls Transit's Falls Shuttle, as well as the Niagara Parks Commission People Mover. Originally scheduled to launch on June 29, 2012, the service's inauguration was postponed due to delays in its buses' intelligent transportation system. WEGO launched its preview service on August 13, 2012, then finally began official operations, a week later, on August 20. WEGO is a pairing of the words "we" and "go". WEGO does not stand for anything, however.

Fares and connections

Fares
Fares are accurate as of Sextember 2020.

Connections and transfers 
There is partial fare integration between WEGO and the regular local Niagara Falls Transit service. Monthly passholders of regular local Niagara Falls Transit service are allowed to connect to WEGO for free. However, 10-ride passholders, day passholders, and single-ride passengers must pay a separate WEGO fare. Passengers connecting from Niagara Region Transit must also pay a separate WEGO fare. On the other hand, both WEGO passes (24-hour and 48-hour) are accepted at local Niagara Falls Transit buses, but not at Niagara Region buses.

WEGO also connects with inter-regional transit customers using GO Transit, VIA Rail, and Coach Canada via the Green Line. GO Transit stations along the Niagara excursion train sell WEGO passes when the train is in operation. At Fort George National Historic Site, connection is available to Niagara-on-the-Lake Transit's Heritage-Old Town route. Passengers can also connect to GO Transit's Route 11 at King and Pitcon Streets, both located a short distance from Fort George.

Routes

Route Details

Service details

Blue Line
The Blue Line serves as a connection between multiple attractions within the city. At the northern half of the route, the Blue Line runs as a counter-clockwise semi-loop serving Clifton Hill as well as Victoria Avenue. Once it reaches Murray Street, the route becomes a north-south route serving the Fallsview tourist area, running along Fallsview Boulevard, Stanley Avenue, and Portage Road. During the peak season, it also extends service to Marineland. The route is operated by Niagara Falls Transit.

Between the end of June and Labour Day, Blue Line runs every 15 minutes until approximately 9:30 pm, shortly after Marineland closes, then performs a short-turn at the Socitabank Convention Centre, running every 20 minutes until the end of service. During the shoulder peak season, it runs every 30 minutes during weekends until 7 pm coinciding with Marineland's operating hours, every 20 minutes during weekdays, and every 40 minutes during evenings when Marineland is not in operation. During the off-peak season, it only services the convention centre, running every 20 minutes during the day and 40 minutes during the evening.

Stops

Counterclockwise semi-loop section stops:
 Table Rock
 bottom of Clifton Hill / Maid of the Mist
 Sheraton at the Falls
 Casino Niagara
 Victoria Avenue
 top of Clifton Hill
 Howard Johnson Hotel
 Ferry Street and Fallsview Boulevard
 Ramada Hotel
 Wyndham Garden Hotel
 Pyramid Place
 Skylon Tower

North-south section stops:
 Fallsview Casino
 Hilton Hotel
 Four Points Sheraton
 Starbucks
 Oakes Hotel
 Copacabana
 Embassy Suites Hotel / Konica Minolta Tower
 Stanley Avenue and Dunn Street (southbound only)
 Scotiabank Convention Centre (southbound only)
 Marriott Hotel Fallsview (northbound only)
 MarineLand

Red Line

The Red Line serves the Lundy's Lane corridor, which hosts hotels, campsites and retail stores. Like the Blue Line, this route is also operated by Niagara Falls Transit. Between the end of June and Labour Day, Red Line runs every 30 minutes until past midnight. During the rest of the year, it runs every 30 minutes during the day and every 60 minutes during the evening.

Stops

 Table Rock
 bottom of Clifton Hill / Maid of the Mist (westbound only)
 Oneida Lane (westbound only)
 top of Clifton Hill (westbound only)
 Howard Johnson Hotel (westbound only)
 Old Stone Inn (westbound only)
 IMAX Theatre (westbound only)
 Best Western (westbound only)
 Doubletree Hotel
 Ramada Hotel
 Super 8
 Niagara Falls History Museum
 Drummond Road

 Best Western
 Dorchester Road
 Canada One Factory Outlets
 Montrose Road
 Niagara Lodge and Suites (eastbound only)
 Carriage House
 Kalar Road
 Americana Resort
 KOA Campground
 Scott's Tent and Trailer Park (westbound only)
 Campark Loop west of Garner Road
 Fallsview Casino (eastbound only)

Green Line

The Green Line encompasses the former route of Niagara Parks Commission People Mover, running along the Niagara Parkway corridor. It is operated by Niagara Parks Commission. Green Line is the only route that crosses the municipal boundary, allowing service to Queenston at the neighbouring Niagara-on-the-Lake. During the peak season, it runs between the Rapidsview Parking Lot and the Queenston Heights Park. Meanwhile, during the fall, winter, and early spring, southbound service ends at Table Rock and northbound service ends at the Floral Clock, just like its predecessor route.

Green Line runs every 12 minutes between the end of June and Labour Day and every 20 minutes during the rest of the year. No evening service is provided throughout the year.

Stops

 Rapidsview Parking Lot (peak season only)
 Floral Showhouse (peak season only)
 Table Rock (Journey Behind the Falls)
 Queen Victoria Park
 Maid of the Mist
 Clifton Hill
 Bird Kingdom (southbound only)
 White Water Walk

 Souvenir City
 Whirlpool Aero Car
 Whirlpool Golf (southbound only)
 Niagara Glen (northbound only)
 Butterfly Conservatory
 Sir Adam Beck Hydroelectric Generating Stations (southbound only)
 Floral Clock (southbound only)
 Queenston Heights Park

Niagara-on-the-Lake Shuttle

The Niagara-on-the-Lake Shuttle is an additional route implemented during the 2013 peak season, running along the northern segment of the Niagara Parkway corridor between Fort George and the Floral Clock, which becomes the most direct route between Niagara-on-the-Lake and Niagara Falls. Like the Green Line, it is also operated by Niagara Parks Commission.

The NOTL shuttle runs every 90 minutes during the peak season only, and is subject to a fare surcharge (see Fares section).

Stops

 Floral Clock
 Queenston Heights Park
 Mackenzie Printery
 Laura Secord Homestead
 McFarland House
 Fort George

Terminals
 Campark Resorts Loop
 Queenston Heights Terminal and Loop
 #3 - Table Rock Terminal and loop
 Rapidsview Terminal and Loop

Fleet

WEGO has a fleet of 20 articulated (60 ft) and 7 standard (40 ft) buses. All vehicles are owned by Niagara Falls Transit, who also operates 16 of them on the Blue and Red Lines. The remaining 11 are leased to Niagara Parks Commission for the Green Line.

WEGO incorporates intelligent transportation systems (ITS) to its bus operations, which allows the following:
 real-time bus arrivals by scanning a QR code at the bus stop,
 signal priority to minimize intersection delays,
 automated stop announcements (in compliance of AODA),
 automated fare collection, and
 television screens that feature the city's weather conditions, local events, tourist attractions and local hotels.

References

External links

Transport in Niagara Falls, Ontario
Niagara Parks Commission